The Chijire Rocks are a group of exposed rocks standing on the coast just west of the mouth of Chijire Glacier in Queen Maud Land. They were mapped from surveys and air photos by the Japanese Antarctic Research Expedition, 1957–62, who also gave the name.

See also
Kani Rock, a rock exposure between Umeboshi Rock and Chijire Rocks

References

External links

Rock formations of Queen Maud Land
Prince Olav Coast